Cathedral Avenue is a short lane situated in Perth between St Georges Terrace and Hay Street east of Barrack Street within the Cathedral Square precinct.

Sometimes it was shown as St. George's Avenue. Cathedral Avenue operates as an access route to both the Treasury Buildings and to St George's Cathedral for formal functions.

History
Changes in the buildings along the course of the lane have revealed a range of significant buildings in the city centre.

Intersections

References

Streets in Perth central business district, Western Australia
Cathedral Square, Perth
Odonyms referring to a building
Odonyms referring to religion